Green Party leadership elections took place in the following countries during 2008:

2008 Green Party (Czech Republic) leadership election
2008 Green Party of England and Wales leadership election

See also
2008 Green Party presidential primaries